RomTech was a software company based in Langhorne, PA, in the late 1990s. They released CD-ROM collections of clipart, games, and small office/home office (SOHO) applications sold at retail stores such as Walmart and Target. In December 1996, RomTech's Galaxy of Games bundle was the #1 bestselling software at a number of major retail outlets.

History 

RomTech made an initial public offering in 1995, at the same time as acquiring Applied Optical Media Corporation. It then acquired Virtual Reality Laboratories in April 1996. On March 1, 1999 Romtech changed its name to eGames and announced a new focus of developing PC titles.

CD-ROM Titles 

RomTech released a number of retail titles on CD-ROM

Other software

References

External links
 RomTech software claims top spot again; Galaxy of Games 2  No. 1 at Wal-Mart
 Rom Tech Inc. signs agreement to merge with Virtual Reality Laboratories Inc.

Defunct software companies of the United States